is a Japanese rakugo comedian and tarento. His debayashi is "Matsuri-bayashi". He is sometimes called .

Hayashiya was the star performer of Rakugo Kyodai. He was once represented with Horipro. Hayashiya is now represented with Negishi Sanpeido. He is not only good in English, he can also speak Chinese.

From May 2016 Hayashiya became a member of "Ōgiri" of Shōten. He is left-handed.

Filmography

TV series

Advertisements

Radio series

Radio drama

Films

References

External links
 
Negishi Sanpeido official website 
Rakugo Kyokai profile 

Rakugoka
Japanese television presenters
1970 births
Living people
Comedians from Tokyo
Chuo University alumni